Hugo Eduardo Carvalho Ferreira dos Santos (born 17 January 1983) is a Portuguese football player who plays for Operário Lagoa.

Club career
He made his professional debut in the Segunda Liga for Portimonense on 24 August 2008 in a game against Varzim.

References

External links
 

1983 births
Footballers from Lisbon
Living people
Portuguese footballers
C.D. Olivais e Moscavide players
Associação Naval 1º de Maio players
Portimonense S.C. players
C.F. União players
G.D. Chaves players
C.D. Santa Clara players
S.C. Praiense players
Liga Portugal 2 players
Campeonato de Portugal (league) players
Association football midfielders